John Lynch may refer to:

Politics

American politicians
John Lynch (Maine politician) (1825–1892), U.S. congressman from Maine
John Lynch (New Hampshire governor) (born 1952), former governor of U.S. state of New Hampshire, 2005–2013
John Lynch (Pennsylvania politician) (1843–1910), U.S. congressman from Pennsylvania
John A. Lynch Jr. (born 1938), New Jersey politician, convicted of fraud
John A. Lynch Sr. (1908–1978), New Jersey politician
John A. Lynch (New York politician), American businessman and politician from New York
John C. Lynch, speaker of the California State Assembly
John D. Lynch (1883–1963), mayor of Cambridge, Massachusetts
John R. Lynch (1847–1939), African-American Republican Mississippi politician after the American Civil War
John M. Lynch (died 1984), American mayor of Somerville, Massachusetts

Other politicians
John Lynch (Australian politician) (1862–1941), member of the Australian House of Representatives, 1914–1919
John Lynch (New South Wales politician) (1875–1944), member of the New South Wales Legislative Assembly, 1907–1913
John Lynch (Kerry politician) (1889–1957), Irish Fine Gael party TD for Kerry North, later Senator
John Lynch (mayor), mayor of Galway, 1489–90
John Óge Lynch, mayor of Galway, 1551–52

Academics and clergy
John Lynch (dean of Canterbury) (1697–1760), Anglican priest
John Lynch (historian) (1927–2018), historian of the Spanish American revolutions
John Lynch (linguist) (1946–2021), professor at the University of the South Pacific in Port Vila, Vanuatu
John Lynch (Gratianus Lucius) (1599?–1677), historian and Archdeacon of Tuam
John Joseph Lynch (1816–1888), Roman Catholic bishop and archbishop of Toronto
John Lynch (archdeacon of Canterbury) (1735–1803), Archdeacon of Canterbury
John Lynch (bishop of Elphin), Irish Anglican bishop

Entertainment
John Lynch, American screenwriter in the silent film era
John Lynch (actor) (born 1961), actor from Northern Ireland
Johnny Lynch, Scottish musician
John Carroll Lynch (born 1963), American actor

Other
John Lynch (American football) (born 1971), former American football safety and broadcaster; current general manager

John Lynch (Fenian) (1832–1866), Irish nationalist
John Lynch (radio), founder and president of Broadcast Company of the Americas
John Lynch (Tyrone Gaelic footballer) (born 1962), former Tyrone Gaelic footballer
John Lynch (Roscommon Gaelic footballer) (1933–2019), Irish Gaelic footballer
John Lynch (Cork Gaelic footballer) (1890–1930), Irish Gaelic footballer
John Lynch (serial killer) (1813–1842), Australian colonial-era serial killer
John Lynch (1740–1820), founder of the city of Lynchburg, Virginia

See also
John A. Lynch (ferryboat), a ferryboat built in 1925
Jack Lynch (disambiguation)